El secreto is a Mexican telenovela produced by Televisa for Telesistema Mexicano in 1963.

Cast 
Magda Guzmán
 
Aurora Cortés
Rosita Aragon
Lilia Juárez
Martha Verduzco
Emilia Carranza
Lupita Lara
María Gentil Arcos
José Cha´vez
Roberto Araya
Victoria Eugenia

References

External links 

Mexican telenovelas
1963 telenovelas
Televisa telenovelas
1963 Mexican television series debuts
1963 Mexican television series endings
Spanish-language telenovelas